Southern Air Transport (SAT) (1947–1998), based in Miami, Florida, was a cargo airline best known as a front company for the Central Intelligence Agency (CIA) (1960–1973) and for its crucial role in the Iran-Contra scandal in the mid-1980s. During the affair, Southern Air transported arms to Iran and to the US-backed stateless mercenary army in Central America known as the Contras, which were fighting the revolutionary Sandinista government in Nicaragua.

History

1947–1986
SAT was founded in 1947 in Miami as a charter airline flying cargo to The Bahamas. By the time it was acquired by the CIA in 1960 for $300,000 (from the company's founder, F. C. "Doc" Moor) it was still small, with three aircraft, and "plenty of debts". SAT became a subsidiary of the CIA's airline proprietary network managed by George A. Doole Jr., the Pacific Corporation. SAT's Pacific Division supported the US war effort in Southeast Asia, and operated 23 Lockheed L-100 Hercules aircraft in its fleet. According to the Miami Herald, during the 13 years the agency owned the airline it earned $3 million in profits, most of which were poured back into the firm to expand its operations.

At one point, SAT was the CIA’s largest “proprietary” – a private business owned by the CIA – with estimated assets of more than $50 million and more than 8,000 employees worldwide.

The CIA sold Southern Air Transport for $2.1 million in 1973 to an aviation executive who had fronted for the agency's ownership of the airline for 13 years, the Miami Herald reported on 10 March 1975. According to the newspaper, SAT had a stockholder equity of $4.2 million when the CIA sold it to Stanley G. Williams, who had fronted as president of the firm from 1962 to 31 December 1973, when he purchased the airline. The Miami Herald said, however, that Williams did not get as good a deal as he wanted for the airline. "It was a long, hard, arms-length transaction," Williams said of the sale.

SAT was sold again in 1979, this time to James H. Bastian – described by the Los Angeles Times in 1986 as "a top-notch Washington, D.C., aviation attorney who had worked with Doole at the Pacific Corp. from 1961 to 1974, as secretary, vice president and general counsel." Under Bastian the company expanded its revenues (from $9.8m in 1982 to $38.m in 1985) and had over 500 employees in 1986.

1982 fleet

As of 1982, the SAT fleet was as follows:

3 Curtiss C-46 Commando
2 Douglas DC-6
1 Douglas DC-8
1 Lockheed L-100-20 Hercules
2 Lockheed L-100-30 Hercules

Previous jet fleet

Southern Air Transport also operated the following jet aircraft types at various times during its existence:

Boeing 707-320C 
Boeing 727-100C 
Boeing 747-200F 
Douglas DC-8 - including DC-8-21F, Super DC-8-71F and Super DC-8-73F freighter aircraft
Lockheed JetStar

Iran–Contra affair
As part of Oliver North's activities to trade arms for hostages with Iran and to support the contra rebellion in Nicaragua, Southern Air carried four loads of US weapons bound for Iran from the US to Israel, and on the return flights carried weapons destined for the US-backed right-wing Contra rebels in Nicaragua  from Portugal. 
On 5 October 1986, a Southern Air Transport C-123K, loaded with weapons, failed to return from a scheduled drop to the Contras in Nicaragua. In charge of the operation was Felix Rodriguez. He was the logistics officer for airlifts of weapons and supplies from the Ilopango air base, in El Salvador, to the jungle hide-outs of the Contras. Rodriguez did not notify the Defense Department or the CIA but rather attempted to get word about the missing C-123K to Donald Gregg, the National Security Advisor for Vice President George H. W. Bush. The shooting down of an SAT flight helped expose the Iran-Contra scandal. Logbooks retrieved from the wreckage linked SAT to a history of involvement with the CIA, cocaine and the Medellin drug cartel. The logs documented several SAT flights to Barranquilla, during October 1985.

In the same time period Wanda Palacios told the FBI that SAT was running drugs. She worked in the early 1980s for Colombia’s Medellin Cartel and had direct knowledge of the cartel’s dealings with the CIA and the Contras. She brought her testimony to US Senator John Kerry. Wanda Palacios had witnessed in 1983-1985 in Barranquilla, the arrival of SAT planes loaded with weapons for the cartel, which would then send them to the Contras. The planes would return to the US loaded with cocaine. Palacio stated that Jorge Luis Ochoa Vásquez himself explained to her the guns-for-drugs deal with the CIA to supply the Contras.

1986–1999

SAT operated out of Kenya during the Rwandan Civil War using L-100 Hercules aircraft. They also recruited and tried to recruit Canadian service members and some members of Relief Air Transport, the Canadian airline operating C-46s in Kenya, into their group.

SAT operated out of Asmara, Ethiopia, (now Eritrea), during the Ethiopian famine of the late '80s.  It hauled thousands of tons of relief supplies in the middle of a hot war under contracts for the UN, Caritas Internationalis, Lutheran World Federation, and the International Committee of the Red Cross, saving thousands of lives.

SAT was also heavily involved in famine and disaster relief efforts in other areas of Africa.  SAT supported the airlift into southern Sudan from the late '80s  into the middle '90s.  At one time, SAT Hercules aircraft were the sole food supply for the refugee camps in the Juba, Sudan area, during the north-south war.  Again, SAT provided food for the helpless and saved countless thousands of lives.

SAT's extensive operations included both offshore and domestic operations and SAT aircraft touched down on all seven continents and in well over a hundred countries. SAT aircraft were based in Papua New Guinea, the U.K, and very commonly in various African countries, as well as other offshore locations, with crews rotating in and out as demand required.

The crews were recruited from both ex-military and civilian-trained personnel.  SAT consistently performed challenging tasks on a wide variety of contracts, many in disturbed areas such as Somalia, both prior to and after the Battle of Mogadishu. SAT Hercules aircraft also operated in Angola, Mozambique, Djibouti, Senegal, and the DRC.

SAT's crew training was maintained to high standards. The aircraft were consistently well-maintained, often under the most difficult of circumstances.

Prior to the military cutback during the Clinton administration, SAT supported the U.S. Air Force's Logair cargo system, as well as the U.S. Navy's Quicktrans systems, operating much more efficiently than the military could using their own airlift.  SAT also flew extensively in Europe and west Asia in support of both the U.S. Air Force and the U.S. Navy, basing out of Ramstein Air Force Base near Landstuhl, Germany, and RAF Mildenhall in East Anglia, U.K.

SAT carried cargo of all possible description, from hauling newspapers from the U.K. to Ireland at night in winter across the Irish sea, to carrying breeding horses to Brazil.  Additionally, SAT was entrusted with King Tutankhamun's treasure. One notable 747 mission involved hauling a load of lions from Amsterdam to Johannesburg, South Africa, the lions being on loan from the Amsterdam Zoo to the Johannesburg Zoo.

SAT Lockheed L-100 Hercules, Boeing 707s, Douglas DC-8s and Boeing 747s served many commercial carriers carrying outsize cargo and hazardous materials. It also performed routine U.S. Embassy supply missions throughout Latin America, covering all of Central and South America, as well as Mexico.

One of SAT's most notable accomplishments was a three-year contract supporting Chevron's drilling operations in the central highlands of Papua New Guinea, operating from a base at Nadzab airport near Lae. Chevron was totally dependent on SAT L-100s, as no roads reached the massive oil recovery operation near Lake Kutubu.  Papua New Guinea provides some of the world's most challenging flying conditions, due both to the rapidly changing tropical monsoons that sweep the island nation, and the rugged terrain of the country.

During the Desert Shield and Desert Storm operations, SAT's accomplishments became widely known. Both the company and the participating crew members received performance awards as members of the Civil Reserve Air Fleet from a grateful U.S. Air Force.

Relocation of SAT from Miami to Columbus
In 1994, Edmund James, president of James and Donohew Development Services, negotiated with SAT and announced that it was locating to Rickenbacker International Airport in Columbus, Ohio. Much of the Hong Kong-to-Rickenbacker cargo was for Leslie Wexner's The Limited Inc. Governor George Voinovich stated: “I am extremely pleased to welcome Southern Air Transport to Ohio, as it will be the first airline to have its world headquarters located at Rickenbacker Airport. This will help Columbus tremendously in becoming a world-class inland port.”

Bankruptcy
In late 1998 it tried to merge with other aviation companies, but it filed for bankruptcy on October 1 in Columbus, Ohio - the same day that the CIA Inspector General released a report detailing allegations of Southern Air Transport’s involvement in drug trafficking in connection with US-backed and funded right-wing Contras in Nicaragua.

On March 10, 1999, the assets of Southern Air Transport were purchased by Southern Air, and the new carrier began operations in November 1999.

See also
Air America
Civil Air Transport
Pegasus Aviation Finance Company
Rendition aircraft
St. Lucia Airways
Tepper Aviation
Evergreen International Aviation
 List of defunct airlines of the United States

Further reading
  (Self published history of Southern Air Transport from its founding in 1947 to its purchase by the CIA in 1960)
William Marcy: The Politics of Cocaine: How U.S. Foreign Policy has created a Thriving Drug Industry in Central and South America. Chicago: Lawrence Hill Books, 2010.
Jonathan Marshall, Peter Dale Scott, Jane Hunter: The Iran-Contra Connection - Secret Teams and Covert Operations in Reagan Era. Boston: South End Press, 1987, 
Bob Fitrakis: Spook Air, Columbus Free Press, 25 October 2018
Carmelo Ruiz-Marrero: El rol de la CIA en el mundo contemporáneo, Revista de Ciencias Sociales de la Universidad de Puerto Rico.

References

Central Intelligence Agency front organizations
Defunct airlines of the United States
Iran–Contra affair